Orthonectida is a small phylum of poorly known parasites of marine invertebrates that are among the simplest of multi-cellular organisms. Members of this phylum are known as orthonectids.

Biology
The adults, which are the sexual stage, are microscopic wormlike animals, consisting of a single layer of ciliated outer cells surrounding a mass of sex cells. They swim freely within the bodies of their hosts, which include flatworms, polychaete worms, bivalve molluscs, and echinoderms. Most are gonochoristic, with separate male and female individuals, but a few species are hermaphroditic.

When they are ready to reproduce, adults leave the host, and sperm from the males penetrate the bodies of the females to achieve internal fertilisation. The resulting zygote develops into a ciliated larva that escapes from the mother to seek out new hosts. Once it finds a host, the larva loses its cilia and develops into a syncytial plasmodium larva. This, in turn, breaks up into numerous individual cells called agametes (ameiotic generative cells) which grow into the next generation of adults.

Classification
The phylum consists of about 20 known species, of which Rhopalura ophiocomae is the best-known. The phylum is not divided into classes or orders, and contains just two families.

Although originally described in 1877 as a class, and later characterized as an order of the phylum Mesozoa, recent study has suggested that orthonectids are quite different from the rhombozoans, the other group in Mesozoa. The genome of one orthonectid species, Intoshia linei, has been sequenced. These animals are simplified spiralians. The genome data confirm earlier findings which allocated these organisms to Spiralia based on their morphology.

Their position in the spiralian phylogenetic tree has yet to be determined. Some work appears to relate them to the Annelida and, within the Annelida, finds them most closely allied to the Clitellata. On the other hand, a 2022 study compensating for long-branch attraction has recovered the traditional grouping of Orthonectida with rhombozoans in a monophyletic Mesozoa placed close to Platyhelminthes or Gnathifera. This supports a previous study which found orthonectids and rhombozoans to make a monophyletic taxon Mesozoa and form a clade with Rouphozoa (platyhelminths and gastrotrichs).

Known species

Phylum Orthonectida
 Family Rhopaluridae Stunkard, 1937
 Ciliocincta
 Ciliocincta akkeshiensis Tajika, 1979 – Hokkaido, Japan; in flatworms (Turbellaria)
 Ciliocincta julini (Caullery and Mesnil, 1899) – E North Atlantic, in polychaetes
 Ciliocincta sabellariae Kozloff, 1965 – San Juan Islands, WA (USA); in polychaete (Neosabellaria cementarium)
 Intoshia 
 Intoshia leptoplanae Giard, 1877 – E North Atlantic, in flatworms (Leptoplana)
 Intoshia linei Giard, 1877 – E North Atlantic, in nemertines (Lineus) = Rhopalura linei
 Intoshia major Shtein, 1953 – Arctic Ocean; in gastropods (Lepeta, Natica, Solariella) = Rhopalura major
 Intoshia metchnikovi (Caullery & Mesnil, 1899) – E North Atlantic, in polychaetes and nemertines
 Intoshia paraphanostomae (Westblad, 1942) – E North Atlantic, in flatworms (Acoela)
 Intoshia variabili (Alexandrov & Sljusarev, 1992) – Arctic Ocean, in flatworms (Macrorhynchus)
 Rhopalura 
 Rhopalura elongata Shtein, 1953 – Arctic Ocean, in bivalves (Astarte)
 Rhopalura gigas (Giard, 1877)
 Rhopalura granosa Atkins, 1933 – E North Atlantic, in bivalves (Pododesmus)
 Rhopalura intoshi Metchnikoff – Mediterranean, in nemertines
 Rhopalura litoralis Shtein, 1953 – Arctic Ocean, in gastropods (Lepeta, Natica, Solariella)
 Rhopalura major Shtein, 1953
 Rhopalura murmanica Shtein, 1953 – Arctic Ocean, in gastropods (Rissoa, Columbella)
 Rhopalura ophiocomae Giard, 1877 – E North Atlantic, in ophiuroids (usually Amphipholis)
 Rhopalura pelseneeri Caullery & Mesnil, 1901 – E North Atlantic, polychaetes and nemertines
 Rhopalura philinae Lang, 1954 – E North Atlantic, in gastropods
 Rhopalura pterocirri de Saint-Joseph, 1896 – E North Atlantic, in polychaetes
 Rhopalura vermiculicola
 Stoecharthrum
 Stoecharthrum burresoni Kozloff, 1993
 Stoecharthrum fosterae Kozloff, 1993
 Stoecharthrum giardi Caullery & Mesnil, 1899 – E North Atlantic, in polychaetes
 Stoecharthrum monnati Kozloff, 1993 – E North Atlantic, in molluscs
 Family Pelmatosphaeridae Stunkard, 1937
 Pelmatosphaera
 Pelmatosphaera polycirri Caullery and Mesnil, 1904 – E North Atlantic, in polychaetes and nemertines

References

 
Animal phyla